Lindale - traditionally Lindale in Cartmel - is a village in the south of Cumbria. It lies on the north-eastern side of Morecambe Bay, England. It was part of Lancashire from 1182 to 1974. It is in the civil parish of Lindale and Newton-in-Cartmel, in South Lakeland district.

History
Lindale's most famous resident was John "Iron-Mad" Wilkinson, an ironworker and inventor who lived in the village from 1750, where he owned the Castle Head estate. He produced the iron for and helped design the world's first iron bridge (at Ironbridge and Broseley) and he made the world's first iron boat in 1787. A large iron obelisk stands in the village as memorial to him.

Traditionally a farming village, Lindale's proximity to the A590 road has seen a growth in the number of commuters who live there. It is also a centre for car showrooms. The local tourist boom has largely missed Lindale, with nearby Grange-over-Sands developing into a seaside resort, and villages to the north and west (such as Windermere) benefiting from their position in the Lake District National Park.

St Paul's Church
St Paul's church is a grade II listed building of 1828–29. It was designed by architect George Webster. Webster, whose practice was based in Kendal, had a house in Lindale.

It includes stained glass by Shrigley and Hunt of Lancaster. The church closed in 2019 as a result of a declining congregation and costs of repair.

See also

Listed buildings in Lindale and Newton-in-Cartmel
Listed buildings in Grange-over-Sands

References

External links  
 Cumbria County History Trust: Upper Allithwaite (nb: provisional research only – see Talk page)

Villages in Cumbria
South Lakeland District